The COVID-19 vaccination campaign in Italy is a mass immunization campaign that was put in place by the Italian government in order to respond to the ongoing COVID-19 pandemic. It started on 27 December 2020, together with most countries in the European Union.

The vaccination campaign was managed by the Ministry of Health and the special commissioner Domenico Arcuri until 1 March 2021, when he was replaced by Army General Francesco Paolo Figliuolo.

Vaccination against COVID-19 is mandatory for all workers, older than 50, in Italy since October 15.

Vaccination program
In the first months of the vaccination campaign, the governmental agencies targeted the health medical and administrative personnel, together with the guests and personnel of nursing homes.

In the second phase of the campaign, elderly people and public service personnel should receive the vaccine.

Vaccines
The Pfizer–BioNTech COVID-19 vaccine was authorized by the European Commission on 21 December 2020, on the same day after receiving recommendation for granting conditional marketing authorization by the Committee for Medicinal Products for Human Use (CHMP) of the European Medicines Agency (EMA).

The Italian government bought, in a coordinated effort with the EU Commission, various types of COVID-19 vaccine, including the Pfizer–BioNTech COVID-19 vaccine, and the ones produced by Moderna, University of Oxford–AstraZeneca, Sanofi, and Johnson & Johnson.

Vaccines on order

Vaccines distribution

Vaccines in trial stage

Chronology

December 2020 
The vaccination campaign started on 27 December 2020, when Italy received 9,750 doses of the Pfizer–BioNTech COVID-19 vaccine. These doses were entirely used in the following days to vaccinate part of the medical and health personnel of hospitals.

The Italian vaccination campaign was coordinated and agreed with the European Union (EU). The EU countries, as per previous agreements, received the vaccine provisions according to a centralized plan developed by the European Commission.

On 30 December 2020, 359,775 doses of vaccine were delivered by Pfizer–BioNTech.

On 31 December 2020, 110,175 doses of vaccine were delivered by Pfizer–BioNTech.

January 2021 
From 30 December 2020 to 1 January 2021, 469,950 doses of vaccine were delivered by Pfizer-BioNTech.

From 5 January 2021 to 7 January 2021, Pfizer-BioNTech delivered another 438 750 doses. This type of vaccine must be stored at -70 °C. The first Italian region to start with vaccinations was Lazio, at the Spallanzani Hospital in Rome. Subsequently, the vaccines were distributed in the other Italian regions.

On 6 January 2021, the European Medicines Agency (EMA) gave its authorization for the Moderna vaccine. At 8 pm on 7 January 2021, 379,910 people were vaccinated in Italy.

According to a scientific study of COVID-19 virology, the Pfizer–BioNTech COVID-19 vaccine also protects against the two mutations of the virus that have spread in the United Kingdom and South Africa.

Both strains share a common mutation called N501Y, a slight alteration at one point in the protein that covers the virus.

On 10 January 2021, the Campania region in Italy had the highest percentage of administration compared to the doses possessed. It also claimed to have exhausted the stock.

On 11 January 2021, 75,075 doses of vaccine were delivered by Pfizer–BioNTech.

On 12 January 2021, 47,000 doses of vaccine were delivered by Moderna.

On 11 and 12 January 2021, 488,475 doses were delivered.

Pfizer has reduced vaccine availability by 29% as of 18 January 2021.
On 16 January 2021, 800 doses of Moderna vaccine were lost due to freezer failure in Forlì.

On 18 and 19 January 2021, there are further delays and reductions in the number of Pfizer–BioNTech COVID-19 vaccines.

On 20 January 2021, the vaccination campaign was slowed down due to a lack of vaccine stock.

On 20 January 2021, AstraZeneca delays the delivery of the vaccine and reduces the expected quantities for deliveries across Europe.

The delay in vaccine supply is delaying the vaccination campaign. On January 29, 2021, Moderna also cut vaccine supplies by 20%. About 300,000 doses are missing in the supply of vaccines provided for in the agreements with Moderna.

The European Union is in sharp confrontation with AstraZeneca on the timing and quantity of vaccine supplies. This leads to a serious delay in the Italian and European vaccination campaign.

On 30 January 2021, AIFA limits the administration of the AstraZeneca vaccine from 18 to 55 years.

February 2021 
On 2 February 2021, the vaccination campaign is slowing sharply due to a lack of deliveries of vaccines by pharmaceutical companies.

On 6 February 2021, the first 249,600 doses of the AstraZeneca vaccine arrived in Italy.

On 12 February 2021, the Genoese architect Renzo Piano was the first to undergo vaccination on Silver Vaccine Day that opens the vaccination campaign for the persons over 80 years old in Liguria.

On 17 February 2021, AIFA extend the administration of the AstraZeneca vaccine until 65 years old.

On 18 February 2021, the senator for life, Liliana Segre was vaccinated at Fatebenefratelli Hospital in Milan. She was received by the President of the Lombardy Region, Attilio Fontana, and the Vice President and Assessor of Welfare, Letizia Moratti.

On 20 February 2021, AstraZeneca reduced vaccine supplies by 15%.

On 23 February 2021, AstraZeneca plans to supply less than half of the doses of vaccine preordered to the European Union.

On 26 February 2021, the vaccination clinics increased to 1436, up from the initial 293.

March 2021
On 1 March 2021, The General of the Italian Army Francesco Paolo Figliuolo is the new special commissioner to replace Domenico Arcuri.

On 9 March 2021, The President of the Italian Republic, Sergio Mattarella was vaccinated in the Spallanzani Hospital. The president was given a dose of Moderna vaccine.

On 11 March 2021, AIFA banned the use in Italy of a batch (number ABV2856) of the AstraZeneca vaccine for checks in relation to the deaths of two men in Sicily after administration of the vaccine.

On 15 March 2021, AIFA suspends the AstraZeneca vaccine throughout Italy on a temporary basis for investigations into death cases after vaccination.

On 19 March 2021, AIFA revoked the ban for AstraZeneca, vaccinations have resumed.

On 20 March 2021, the special commissioner, Army General Francesco Paolo Figliuolo and the chief of Protezione Civile Fabrizio Curcio were vaccinated with the AstraZeneca vaccine.

On 25 March 2021, the name of the AstraZeneca vaccine was changed to Vaxzevria in the European Union.

On 30 March 2021, Prime Minister Mario Draghi and his wife Maria Serenella Cappello were vaccinated with the AstraZeneca vaccine in the Termini station hub in Rome, as required by the Lazio Region vaccination plan.

April 2021
On 3 April 2021, a firebombing occurred at a vaccine cold storage site in Brescia but did not damage the building's electrical supply, meaning vaccines remained usable.

On 6 April 2021, AstraZeneca postponed delivery of 50% doses scheduled for 14 April 2021.

Meanwhile, Oxford University's Jenner Institute is suspending testing of the vaccine on children. The Oxford University's Jenner Institute decision was made pending an analysis of the possible links between the drug and episodes of thrombosis among adults.

In Italy, 54% of doses of AstraZeneca vaccine have been administered to date (2,218,038 out of 4,098,800 delivered), according to the Ministero della Salute, while for Moderna vaccine the percentage drops to 50% (658,403 out of 1,328,200). Pfizer vaccine has a 96% administration rate, (8,375,625 out of 8,709,480). In total, out of 14,136,480 doses of the three vaccines arrived in Italy, 11,252,066 were administered, about 80%.

On 13 April 2021, 184,000 doses of the Janssen vaccine arrived in Italy, however Johnson & Johnson announced that it would delay deliveries of its vaccines to Europe.

AIFA has cautiously suspended distribution to vaccination centers pending information from the United States where the Janssen vaccine has been suspended for investigation into suspicious deaths and thrombosis disorders following the administration of the Janssen vaccine.

On 22 April 2021, Johnson & Johnson vaccine started to administration in Italy.

May 2021 
On 1 May 2021, Italy reached 20 million administered vaccine doses. At this point, the country had vaccinated 14 million with at least a single dose and 6 million are fully vaccinated.

On 2 May 2021, two anti-vaxxers were arrested and charged with terrorism offences for the firebombing at the Brescia vaccination centre.

On 10 May 2021, a nurse accidentally injected a patient with 6 doses of Pfizer BioNTech.

On 22 May 2021, Italy reached 30 million administered vaccine doses. At this point, the country has 9.9 million people vaccinated with a double dose.

June 2021 
On 1 June 2021, Italy reached 35 million administered vaccine doses. At this point, the country has 12 million people vaccinated with a double dose.

On 10 June 2021, Italy reached 40 million administered vaccine doses.

On 28 June 2021, Italy reached 50 million administered vaccine doses.

July 2021 
On 16 July 2021, Italy reached 60 million administered vaccine doses.
At this point, the country has 25 million people vaccinated with a double dose.

August 2021 
On 5 August 2021, Italy reached 70 million administered vaccine doses.

September 2021 
On 9 September 2021, Italy reached 80 million administered vaccine doses.

October 2021 
Third dose vaccinations begin to fragile subjects and health workers.

November 2021 
On 3 November 2021, Italy reached 90 million administered vaccine doses.

On 4 November 2021, The President of the Italian Republic, Sergio Mattarella, received the third dose of the vaccine in the Spallanzani Hospital.

December 2021 
On 9 December 2021, Italy reached 100 million administered vaccine doses.
The pediatric mRNA vaccine Comirnaty (Pfizer) authorized by the European Medicines Agency (EMA) and the Italian Medicines Agency (AIFA) is reserved for children aged 5–11.

On 16 December 2021, the vaccinations for children with the pediatric vaccine began.

On 27 December 2021, exactly one year from the start of the vaccination campaign, Italy administered 108 million doses.

January 2022

Vaccinations in Italy

Vaccinations in Italian regions

• The quantities delivered are currently calculated at five doses per vial. Therefore, any percentage values above 100 show the use of the sixth dose.

Vaccinations by age groups

References

COVID-19 pandemic in Italy
Italy
2020 in Italy
December 2020 events in Italy
2021 in Italy
January 2021 events in Italy
February 2021 events in Italy
March 2021 events in Italy
April 2021 events in Italy